Prolymphocytic leukemia is divided into two types according to the kind of cell involved:  B-cell prolymphocytic leukemia and T-cell prolymphocytic leukemia.  It is usually classified as a kind of chronic lymphocytic leukemia.

References

External links 

Lymphocytic leukemia